Michael Bernard Easson AM (born 22 March 1955 in Sydney, New South Wales, Australia), is an Australian businessman and former trade union leader. On 8 June 1998 Easson was appointed as a Member of the Order of Australia (AM).

Trade union work

Easson's working career began in 1978 as a Research Assistant to the Hon. John Brown MP. He then joined the Labor Council of New South Wales (now Unions NSW) as Education & Research Officer, then Assistant Secretary (1984) and Secretary (1989–1994). At the age of 34, he was elected as the youngest ever Secretary. He elected Vice President of the Australian Council of Trade Unions, 1993 to 1994, and Senior Vice President of the Labor Party (NSW Branch) between 1993 and 1995. Whilst at the Labor Council he was managing director of Radio Station 2KY (1989 to 1994), and in 1989 co-founded both Asset Super (since 2012 part of CARE Super) and Chifley Financial Services. Between 1978 and 1987 Easson served as a member for the NSW Council of the Trade Union Trading Authority (TUTA).

In 1994, Easson resigned as secretary of the Labor Council after a botched candidacy for the Senate vacancy left by the resigning Graham Richardson and a falling out with Labor state secretary John Della Bosca, which was followed by a failed attempt to find a seat in the New South Wales Legislative Council, of which he had previously been dismissive.

Business related
Easson joined the private sector in 1994, recruited by Sydney Olympic Bid Chief Rod McGeogh for law firm Corrs Chambers Westgarth, and serving on various Boards, including as an independent Director on Macquarie's Industrial Property fund, a predecessor to the Goodman Group, the industrial property REIT. Specialising as a company director with businesses in infrastructure, construction and investment, along with Sydney businessmen Shane Geha and Adam Geha, Easson formed EG Property, of which he is co-owner and Executive chairman.

Easson presently serves as non-Executive Chair of the Association of Superannuation Funds of Australia (ASFA), Executive Director and co-owner of both EG and the building technology company Ridley & Co, and non-executive Chair of the Canberra Renewal Authority.

In March 2017, he stepped down as Chair of Icon Water, formerly known as ACTEW Corporation, and as Chair of ActewAGL, the energy distribution and retail business in Canberra. In July 2016, Michael Easson retired as a director of ANZ Stadium.

From 2012 to 2014 he was Chair of the Ministerial Advisory Council on Skilled Migration.

Easson has served on several top 50 Australian and other boards; his experience includes as a director NSW State Superannuation Board and predecessor boards (1986–1995), the State Rail Authority (1989–1993), NRMA Insurance (1993 to 1996), Macquarie-Goodman Industrial Fund (1994–2003), Barclay Mowlem (1998–2000), InTech (1998–2003), Macquarie Infrastructure Group (1996 to 2007), Kaldor family company boards in apparel, chemicals and office works (1997 to 2004), Metro Transport Sydney (2002–2006), Sydney Roads Group (2006–2007), and the ING Group Real Estate Group in Australia (2004–2012).

He was the inaugural Chairman of the NSW Urban Taskforce, an urban planning policy advocate group in Australia, from 2000 to 2002.

Easson was a foundation Member of the National Competition Council (1996 to 1999) and an Assistant Commissioner and Commissioner of several Productivity Reports, including the review of Work, Health and Safety in Australia (1994–1995). He served as Chairman of the Review of Commonwealth Payments to Statutory Authorities and Special Purpose Payment to the States from 1995 to 1996. According to then Finance Minister John Fahey in 1997, this resulted in one-off saving of $400 million to the Australian Government.

He was Adjunct Professor of Management at the Australian Graduate School of Management from 1994 to 1998 and served as senior Vice President of UNICEF Australia from 1998 to 2002 and as a member of the Board of the Museum of Contemporary Art (1999–2000) and as a Director of the Sydney Symphony (1995–1996).

Early life and education
Michael Easson was born in Sydney on 22 March 1955. He was educated at St Declan's Primary, Marist Brothers Penshurst and he matriculated at Sydney Technical High School in 1972.

Easson graduated with First Class Honours in Politics from the University of New South Wales in 1976. In 1981 he completed a Trade Union Program at the Harvard Business School and completed management and finance programs at Stanford Business School in 1997, and more recently a Masters in Science in Sustainable Development (with Distinction) from Campion Hall, University of Oxford, and a PhD in history from the University of New South Wales. In 2016, Easson was awarded a second PhD in Transport and Urban Planning from the University of Melbourne.

He is married to former federal politician Mary Easson (Member for Lowe, from 1993 to 1996). They have two adult daughters.

Bibliography

Books

Book reviews

References

External links 
 Michael Easson Official Website

1955 births
Australian businesspeople
Australian trade unionists
Harvard Business School alumni
Stanford Graduate School of Business alumni
Members of the Order of Australia
Spouses of Australian politicians
Businesspeople from Sydney
Living people
ING Group
University of New South Wales alumni
Alumni of Campion Hall, Oxford